Ahmed bin Jassim Al Thani (Arabic: أحمد بن جاسم آل ثاني) is a Qatari businessman, politician and a member of the royal family, Al Thani.

Early life and education
Al Thani is a member of the ruling family of Qatar. He is a graduate of the University of United Arab Emirates where he obtained a bachelor of science degree in petroleum engineering. He received a master's degree in integrated reservoir project management from Imperial College.

Career
Ahmed Al Thani worked in different petroleum engineering projects in Qatar and abroad. He was a board member at Qatargas. After resignation of Wadah Khanfar from Al Jazeera, Al Thani became the director general of the channel in September 2011. He left channel on 26 June 2013 when he was appointed minister of economy and commerce. From 3 July until November 2018, he was made member to the administrative council of the Qatar Investment Authority (QIA). He was appointed in 2020 as the economic advisor to the Amir, and also in 2021 as the secretary general of the Supreme Council of Economic Affairs and Investment.

Awards
Arabian Business named Al Thani as the most powerful Qatari businessman in 2012. He was chosen as the 38th most powerful Arab by Gulf Business in 2013.

References

External links

Alumni of Imperial College London
Living people
Ahmed
Government ministers of Qatar
Qatari businesspeople
Qatari media executives
United Arab Emirates University alumni
Year of birth missing (living people)
Qatari engineers